Juan Rondón Martínez (c. 1790 – c. 1843) was Mayor of Ponce, Puerto Rico, in 1843.

Municipal works
Rondón Martinez is best known for having inaugurated, in 1843, Ponce's old cemetery (Viejo Cementerio de Ponce) on Calle Simon de la Torre. This cemetery, also called Antiguo Cementerio de Ponce, became the Panteón Nacional Román Baldorioty de Castro. Rondon Martínez was the first person to be buried in the cemetery.

Honors
In Ponce there is a street in Urbanización Las Delicias of Barrio Magueyes named after him.

See also

List of Puerto Ricans

References

Further reading
 Fay Fowlie de Flores. Ponce, Perla del Sur: Una Bibliográfica Anotada. Second Edition. 1997. Ponce, Puerto Rico: Universidad de Puerto Rico en Ponce. p. 124. Item 624. 
 Mariano Vidal Armstrong. Quien es quien en Ponce y leyendas de antaño. Ponce, Puerto Rico: Imprenta Fortuño. 1986. (Colegio Universitario Tecnológico de Ponce, CUTPO; Recinto Universitario de Mayaguez, RUM)

Mayors of Ponce, Puerto Rico
Burials at Panteón Nacional Román Baldorioty de Castro
1790s births
1840s deaths
Year of birth uncertain
Year of death uncertain